The 2012 Africa Cup was the twelfth edition of the Africa Cup, an annual international rugby union tournament for African nations organised by the Confederation of African Rugby (CAR). The tournaments between 2012 and 2014 will also serve as qualifiers for the 2015 Rugby World Cup.

Changes from last season
Changes from the 2011 Africa Cup:
  were relegated from Division 1B to Division 1C after withdrawing from the 2011 event.
  were promoted from Division 1C to Division 1B.
 Division 1D was discontinued.
 Division 2 (North) and Division 2 (South) were merged into a single Division 2.
  and  joined in Division 2.
  withdrew from Division 2 (North).
  and  withdrew from Division 2.

Group 1A
Group 1A was held from 10 to 14 July in Tunis, Tunisia.

Teams
The teams competing in Group 1A:

Table

Results

Semi-finals

Third place playoff

Final

Group 1B
Group 1B was held from 4–11 July in Antananarivo, Madagascar.

Teams
The teams competing in Group 1B:

Table

 were promoted to Group 1A. were relegated to Group 1C and eliminated from the 2015 Rugby World Cup.

Results

Semi-finals

Third place playoff

Final

 Two all-time Test rugby records were set in this match:
 Namibia's 54 points set a new record for the highest score by a losing team.
 The full-time score of 43–43 was the highest-scoring draw at full-time in history.

Group 1C
Group 1C was held on 22–28 July in Gaborone, Botswana.  There were three rounds, with no final.

Cameroon withdraw at a very late stage, and as such, the tournament was reduced to a 5-team tournament.

Teams
The teams competing in Group 1C:
 
 
 
 
 
  - withdrawn

Games

Game Day 1

Game Day 2

Game Day 3

Final table

Division 2
Division 2 was held on 29–30 June in Lomé, Togo.  The tournament was played under Rugby 7's laws.

Teams
The teams competing in Division 2:
 
 
 
 
 
 
  A
  B

Pool A

Match Schedule

Pool B

Match Schedule

Knockout stage

Plate Semi-finals

Cup Semi-finals

Seventh-place game

Plate final

Third-place game

Cup final

Under-19
An Under-19 competition was held from 25 Aug - 1 Sep in Harare, Zimbabwe. The winner will qualify for the 2013 IRB Junior World Rugby Trophy.  The winner of Division B (Madagascar) will replace the last place finisher in Division A (Tunisia) for the 2013 tournament.

Teams
The teams competing in the Under-19 competition:
Division A
 
 
 
 

Division B
 
 
 

Uganda pulled out of Division B, and was replaced with a Harare U19 Select XV.

Division A

Match Schedule

Division B

Match Schedule

See also
Africa Cup
2015 Rugby World Cup – Africa qualification

References

2012
2012 rugby union tournaments for national teams
2012 in African rugby union